Saint-Maurice-de-Rotherens is a former commune in the Savoie department in the Auvergne-Rhône-Alpes region in south-eastern France. On 1 January 2019, it was merged into the new commune Saint-Genix-les-Villages. In 2019, it had 212 residents.

Geography 
The commune is located on the ridge of Mont Tournier.

See also
Communes of the Savoie department

References

Former communes of Savoie